Anna Wiener is an American writer, best known for her 2020 memoir Uncanny Valley. Wiener currently writes for The New Yorker as a tech correspondent.

Life
Wiener grew up in Brooklyn and attended Wesleyan University in Middletown, CT. She worked in the tech sector in San Francisco in an attempt to find a career path with more "momentum" than the book publishing industry, where she was previously employed. Interested in data, particularly the way in which it could be used to tell stories, she worked for an analytics startup and GitHub, and befriended Stripe CEO Patrick Collison. Her book, Uncanny Valley, never mentions the names of the companies she worked at or interacted with, though she often describes their products and corporate cultures in sufficient detail for the reader to deduce what they are. After several years in San Francisco, she left the tech industry for several reasons, including its lack of response to the classified information released by Edward Snowden and a wider disillusionment with the corporate culture and sexism present therein.

Since leaving tech, Wiener has been writing about Silicon Valley for The New Republic, n+1, Atlantic, and others. She is a contributing writer to The New Yorker.

Selected works
 Uncanny Valley (MCD Books, 2020)

References

External links
 
Constance Grady, Uncanny Valley author Anna Wiener on the stories tech companies tell themselves Vox, Feb 3, 2020
Pete Tosiello, Silicon Valley Hustling: An Interview with Anna Wiener, Paris Review, January 9, 2020

Living people
The New Yorker people
American women memoirists
21st-century American memoirists
Writers from Brooklyn
Year of birth missing (living people)
American women journalists
American technology writers
Women technology writers
Journalists from New York City
21st-century American journalists
21st-century American women writers
GitHub people
Silicon Valley people